The Argentina All Stars represent Argentina in women's international roller derby.  The team was first formed to compete at the 2011 Roller Derby World Cup, and finished the tournament in last place, out of thirteen teams. They improved on this placing at the 2014 edition, finishing 8th overall.

Team roster

2017
As of November 2017, Team Argentina is composed of the following active skaters:

2016
In April 2016, Team Argentina underwent a major restructuring with new open Tryouts. The following skaters passed the tryouts and became part of the national team, road to the 2018 Roller Derby World Cup in Manchester.

2014
Argentina competed at the 2014 Roller Derby World Cup with skaters from the following training roster:

2011 team
Several team members struggled to obtain appropriate equipment in advance of the World Cup; a benefit was organised by the Derby News Network, and various sponsors donated kit to the team.  However, Nina Brava, one of the team's skaters, claimed that Argentina had an advantage in that they had been able to practise together for more hours than their opponents.

After the group stage of the World Cup, Argentina were ranked twelfth, with no wins.  They then lost narrowly to Team Scotland, by 114 points to 91, thereby finishing the tournament in last place.

Argentina announced its initial team roster in August 2011:

References

Argentina
Roller derby
Roller derby in Argentina
2011 establishments in Argentina
Sports clubs established in 2011